Jin Renqing (29 July 1944 – 28 August 2021) was a Chinese politician, member of the 16th Central Committee of the Chinese Communist Party, serving as deputy chief of the Development Research Center of the State Council. He also served as finance minister from 2003 to 2007.

Biography
Jin was born in Suzhou, Jiangsu, on 29 July 1944. Jin served in such positions as commissioner of the State Administration of Taxation, vice governor of Yunnan, deputy secretary general of the State Council, and executive vice mayor of Beijing. He served as Finance Minister, from 2003 until his resignation at age 63 in August 2007. During his tenure, China enjoyed economic growth and an increase in foreign currency reserves, while also experiencing an increase in its trade deficit to the US. Jin was succeeded by tax administrator Xie Xuren. On 28 August 2021, he died of fire burns in Haidian District, Beijing, aged 77.

Sex scandal
At the time of Jin's resignation the Hong Kong media have speculated a sex scandal. On 8 September 2007, Ming Pao reported that, Jin was in detention assisting security officials with their enquiries. In June 2011, WikiLeaks released a leaked US State Department cable dated 20 September 2007 which claims that Jin was sacked for his role in a sex scandal with a female intelligence operative from Taiwan. The cable claims that the alleged spy had affairs with several Chinese officials including former agricultural minister Du Qinglin, former party secretary of Qingdao Du Shicheng and the China Petroleum and Chemical Corporation (Sinopec) chairman Chen Tonghai.

References

|-

1944 births
2021 deaths
People's Republic of China politicians from Jiangsu
Politicians from Suzhou
Deputy mayors of Beijing
Ministers of Finance of the People's Republic of China
Political office-holders in Yunnan
Central University of Finance and Economics alumni
Deaths from fire